Gopal Chinayya Shetty is an Indian politician. He is a member of parliament from Mumbai North. Previously, he was a Member of Legislative Assembly (MLA) from the Borivali Vidhan Sabha constituency.He is currently the Member of Parliament for Mumbai-North constituency 

He was the president of the Mumbai unit of Bharatiya Janata Party.

He has also served the Bharatiya Janata Party in various capacities from Mandal secretary to the president of Mumbai BJP.

In 2016, Shetty surrendered public land, including the Poinsur Gymkhana, Kamla Vihar Sports Complex and Veer Savarkar Udyan plots, which had been directly or indirectly placed under his control.

Shetty, BJP candidate, won in 2019 Indian general elections against Congress party (INC)candidate Urmila Matondkar in North constituency of Mumbai by a whopping margin of 4,65,247 votes.

Controversies 
His remarks about farmer suicide created ruckus in media, later he clarified he was misquoted.“Not all farmers’ suicides happen due to unemployment and starvation. A fashion is going on. A trend is on,” He was slammed by activist and opposition for his 'sexist' private member's bill in Lok Sabha.

He stoked a controversy by saying Christians did not participate in freedom movement. Allege corruption in utilization of open spaces.

References

Maharashtra MLAs 2004–2009
Living people
Politicians from Mumbai
1954 births
Maharashtra MLAs 2009–2014
India MPs 2014–2019
Lok Sabha members from Maharashtra
Bharatiya Janata Party politicians from Maharashtra
Marathi politicians
India MPs 2019–present
National Democratic Alliance candidates in the 2019 Indian general election